The 1937 All-Big Ten Conference football team consists of American football players selected to the All-Big Ten Conference teams chosen by various selectors for the 1937 Big Ten Conference football season.

All Big-Ten selections

Ends
 Ray Wallace King, Minnesota (AP-1; UP-1)
 Bob Lannon, Iowa (AP-1; UP-2)
 Jim Zachary, Purdue (UP-1)
 Robert Fitzgerald, Chicago (AP-2)
 Fred Benz, Wisconsin (AP-2)
 Bob Kenderdine, Indiana (UP-2)

Tackles
 Bob Haak, Indiana (UP-1)
 Carl Kaplanoff, Ohio State (UP-1)
 Lou Midler, Minnesota (AP-1)
 Marty Schreyer, Purdue (AP-1)
 Lou Midler, Minnesota (UP-2)
 Alex Schoenbaum, Ohio State (AP-2)
 Don Siegel, Michigan (AP-2)
 Clem Woltman, Purdue (UP-2)

Guards
 Francis Twedell, Minnesota (AP-1; UP-1)
 Ralph Heikkinen, Michigan (AP-2; UP-1)
 Gust Zarnas, Ohio State (AP-1; UP-2)
 Jim Sirtosky, Indiana (AP-2)
 Mel Brewer, Illinois (UP-2)

Centers
 Ralph Wolf, Ohio State (AP-1)
 George Miller, Indiana (AP-2; UP-1)
 James W. McDonald, Illinois (UP-2)

Quarterbacks
 Jim McDonald, Ohio State (AP-1; UP-1)
 Fred Vanzo, Northwestern (AP-2)

Halfbacks
 Nile Kinnick, Iowa (AP-2; UP-1)
 Cecil Isbell, Purdue (AP-1; UP-2 [fullback])
 Don Heap, Northwestern (AP-1; UP-2 [quarterback])
 Rudy Gmitro, Minnesota (UP-1)
 Hal Van Every, Minnesota (AP-2; UP-2)
 Bill Schmitz, Wisconsin (UP-2)

Fullbacks
 Corbett Davis, Indiana (AP-1; UP-1)
 Larry Buhler, Minnesota (AP-2)

Key
AP = Associated Press

UP = United Press

Bold = Consensus first-team selection of both the AP and UP

See also
 1937 College Football All-America Team

References

1937 Big Ten Conference football season
All-Big Ten Conference football teams